Yan Chen (born July 11, 1966) is a Chinese American behavioral and experimental economist. She is Daniel Kahneman Collegiate Professor of Information at the University of Michigan School of Information, research professor in the Research Center for Group Dynamics at the University of Michigan Institute for Social Research, and distinguished visiting professor at the School of Economics and Management at Tsinghua University, where she directs the Economics Science and Policy Experimental Lab.  She is a former president of the Economic Science Association, an international organization of experimental economists.

Biography 

Chen studied English for Science and Technology as an undergraduate student in China, and became interested in Economics because of the impact of the Chinese economic reform happening around her.  Since English majors were not eligible for graduate school in economics in China, she came to the U.S. for graduate school at Caltech. Her first position at the University of Michigan was in the economics department, but she did not receive tenure in that department.  Since her husband was a tenured professor of physics at the same university, she wanted to find a position nearby, and she was recruited to a new position on the faculty of the University of Michigan School of Information.

Research 

Chen is known for her research on behavioral and experimental economics, market and mechanism design, and public economics

Selected works
 Chen, Yan, and Sherry Xin Li. "Group identity and social preferences." American Economic Review 99, no. 1 (2009): 431–57.
 Chen, Roy, and Yan Chen. "The potential of social identity for equilibrium selection." American Economic Review 101, no. 6 (2011): 2562–89.
 Chen, Yan, F. Maxwell Harper, Joseph Konstan, and Sherry Xin Li. "Social comparisons and contributions to online communities: A field experiment on movielens." American Economic Review 100, no. 4 (2010): 1358–98.
Chen, Yan, and Tayfun Sönmez. "School choice: an experimental study." Journal of Economic theory 127, no. 1 (2006): 202–231.
 Chen, Yan, and Fang-Fang Tang. "Learning and incentive-compatible mechanisms for public goods provision: An experimental study." Journal of Political Economy 106, no. 3 (1998): 633–662.
 Chen, Yan. "Incentive-compatible mechanisms for pure public goods: A survey of experimental research." Handbook of experimental economics results 1 (2008): 625–643.

References 

Living people
21st-century American economists
Experimental economists
California Institute of Technology alumni
University of Michigan faculty
Tsinghua University alumni
1966 births